North Dakota is a state in the Midwestern United States. The development of the region's Bakken formation has led to an oil boom economy and produced one of the lowest unemployment rates in the United States and renewed population growth in the state. Oil and gas is now the state's largest contributor to the economy, replacing the agricultural sector.

Largest firms 
This list shows firms in the Fortune 500, which ranks firms by total revenues reported before January 31, 2018. Only the top five firms (if available) are included as a sample.

Notable firms 
This list includes notable companies with primary headquarters located in the state. The industry and sector follow the Industry Classification Benchmark taxonomy. Organizations which have ceased operations are included and noted as defunct.

See also
 List of cities in North Dakota

References

Companies
North Dakota